The Tractus Fossae are a set of troughs in the Tharsis quadrangle of Mars, located at 26° north latitude and 101.4° west longitude. The term "fossae" is used to indicate large troughs when using geographical terminology related to Mars. Troughs, sometimes also called grabens, form when the crust is stretched until it breaks, which forms two breaks with a middle section moving down, leaving steep cliffs along the sides. Sometimes, a line of pits form as materials collapse into a void that forms from the stretching.

References

See also

 Fossa (geology)
 Geology of Mars 
 HiRISE

Valleys and canyons on Mars
Tharsis quadrangle